Ouleymata Sarr (born 8 October 1995) is a French professional footballer who plays as a forward for Division 1 Féminine club Paris FC and the France national team.

Club career
Sarr spent four seasons at Paris Saint-Germain and scored in the 2014–15 UEFA Women's Champions League against Frankfurt. Prior to the 2017–18 season, Sarr transferred from PSG to Lille. She scored a hat-trick on her debut for Lille and scored a further 17 in the 2018–19 season. In 2019, Sarr signed for Bordeaux. Her 2020–21 season, which was also her last season with the Girondins, was plagued by injuries and she only played three matches. In June 2021, Sarr signed for Paris FC.

International career
In 2014, Sarr was called up to the French U19 team and later to the U20 team for the 2014 FIFA U-20 Women's World Cup. Sarr scored a goal in a group stage match against Costa Rica. In October 2017, Sarr scored the opening goal for the French senior team in a 8–0 win against Ghana. She was not selected for the 2019 FIFA Women's World Cup. Sarr played at UEFA Women's Euro 2022.

Personal life
Sarr was born in Évreux, where she played football with boys until the age of 13 before she stopped playing for two years. She is of Mauritanian descent.

Career statistics

International

Scores and results list France's goal tally first, score column indicates score after each Sarr goal.

References

External links
 Soccerway
 UEFA Profile
 
 

1995 births
Living people
Sportspeople from Évreux
French sportspeople of Mauritanian descent
French women's footballers
Women's association football forwards
Black French sportspeople
France women's youth international footballers
France women's international footballers
Division 1 Féminine players
Paris Saint-Germain Féminine players
Lille OSC (women) players
FC Girondins de Bordeaux (women) players
Paris FC (women) players
Footballers from Normandy
UEFA Women's Euro 2022 players